Juraj Mintál (born 13 March 1971) is a retired Slovak football defender.

References

1971 births
Living people
Slovak footballers
FC DAC 1904 Dunajská Streda players
MFK Karviná players
MŠK Rimavská Sobota players
MFK Ružomberok players
MŠK Žilina players
Association football defenders
Czechoslovak First League players
Czech First League players
Slovak expatriate footballers
Expatriate footballers in the Czech Republic
Slovak expatriate sportspeople in the Czech Republic
Sportspeople from Žilina